Jackie Delane Aker (born July 13, 1940) is an American former professional baseball relief pitcher. He played in Major League Baseball (MLB) for the Kansas City / Oakland Athletics, Seattle Pilots, New York Yankees, Chicago Cubs, Atlanta Braves, and New York Mets.

Career
Aker was originally signed as an outfielder by the Kansas City Athletics and led the Nebraska State League in stolen bases in his first year, 1959, before being converted to a pitcher before the 1960 season.  He made it to the majors as a side-arming sinkerballer, pitching for the Kansas City/Oakland Athletics (1964–68), Seattle Pilots (1969), New York Yankees (1969–72), Chicago Cubs (1972–73), Atlanta Braves (1974), and New York Mets (1974). During an 11-year baseball career, Aker compiled 47 wins, 404 strikeouts, a 3.28 earned run average, and 123 saves, an impressive total at the time.

Aker made his major league debut for the Athletics on May 3, 1964, tossing  innings in relief while allowing three earned runs in an 8–7 win over the Minnesota Twins. He made nine total relief appearances for Kansas City in 1964, posting an 0–1 record with an ERA of 8.81.

On September 10, 1965, Aker pitched six innings of relief while allowing just one earned run and striking out three to earn the win in a 10–5 win over the Baltimore Orioles.

Aker's best season came in 1966 with the A's, when he led the American League in saves (32, a major league record until 1970) and games finished (57), had a 1.99 ERA, finished 13th in the MVP voting, and was named AL Fireman of the Year by The Sporting News.

On September 7, 1966, Aker earned his 30th save of the season with  innings of shutout relief against the California Angels.

On April 29, 1967, he pitched the last  innings of a 15-inning loss to the Boston Red Sox, striking out a career-high eight batters and allowing just two runs.

On April 24, 1968, in just the eighth baseball game ever played at the Oakland–Alameda County Coliseum, Aker pitched the last five innings, allowing no runs and earning the win in an 11-inning victory over the New York Yankees.

After a series of run-ins with A's owner Charles O. Finley, Aker, the team's union player representative, was made available in the expansion draft for the 1969 season, and was picked up by the Seattle Pilots with the 24th pick. On April 8, 1969, Aker earned a save in the first game in franchise history, a 4–3 win over the California Angels. However, he began to struggle soon after, going 0–2 with three saves and a 7.56 ERA in 15 appearances for the Pilots. 

On May 20, Aker was traded to the Yankees for Fred Talbot. After the trade, he ran up a string of 33 consecutive scoreless innings, still a regular season Yankee record. Aker led the Yankees in saves that year and finished both 1969 and 1970 with ERAs of 2.06, despite career-threatening back surgery in the intervening winter. 

Aker remained a mainstay of the Yankee bullpen until 1972, when New York's acquisition of Sparky Lyle from Boston made Aker expendable. On May 17, he was traded to the Chicago Cubs for cash considerations. Aker pitched almost three seasons in the NL, and was standing in the bullpen feet away from where teammate Hank Aaron's historic 715th home run landed on April 8, 1974.

After his playing days ended, Aker managed in the minor leagues in 1975–85, winning the Governor's Cup (International League Championship) with the 1982 Tidewater Tides (Mets organization), and was the Cleveland Indians pitching coach from late 1985 to 1987. He left pro baseball after the 1988 season to teach children, and for 20 years offered camps, clinics, and baseball instruction through his "Jack Aker Baseball" academy. In 1997, he was honored by President Bill Clinton with a "Giant Steps Award" for his work teaching at-risk Native American children on reservations in Arizona and New Mexico.

Aker is of Potawatomi ancestry.

See also

 List of Major League Baseball annual saves leaders
 List of Major League Baseball leaders in games finished

References

External links

Jack Aker at Baseball Almanac

1940 births
Living people
People from Tulare, California
Cleveland Indians coaches
Major League Baseball pitching coaches
Major League Baseball pitchers
Baseball players from California
Kansas City Athletics players
Oakland Athletics players
Seattle Pilots players
New York Yankees players
Chicago Cubs players
College of the Sequoias Giants baseball players
Atlanta Braves players
New York Mets players
Grand Island A's players
Buffalo Bisons (minor league) managers
Norfolk Tides managers
Visalia A's players
Lewiston Broncs players
Albuquerque Dukes players
Portland Beavers players
Dallas Rangers players
Vancouver Mounties players
People from West Windsor, New Jersey
American people of Potawatomi descent